Telephone numbers in North Korea are regulated by the Ministry of Post and Telecommunications.

Area codes
This is the official list as registered with ITU-T in 2011.

Mobile networks
0191 - Koryolink WCDMA Network
0192 - Koryolink WCDMA Network
0193 - SunNet GSM900 Network (discontinued in 2004) 
0195 - KangsongNET GSM900 Network

Number lengths

Little is known about phone numbers in the rest of the country, as phone numbers outside Pyongyang and Rason are not able to be dialled from overseas and are hence not advertised in any overseas publications.

International dialing
Overseas callers to North Korea will usually need to go through the international operator service on +850 2 18111. A select few numbers (mostly fax numbers) are able to be dialled directly, without operator assistance.

Phone numbers in Pyongyang which can call internationally and which can receive calls internationally always begin with 381 in the local number, e.g. +850 2 381 xxxx. These numbers cannot be dialled domestically and cannot make calls domestically, so usually an organisation with international connectivity will have a 381 international number and a 382 domestic number. For example, the British Embassy in Pyongyang can be dialled as +850 2 381 7980 internationally and 02 382 7980 domestically. 381 numbers can, however, call other 381 numbers domestically.

Many North Koreans smuggle in mobile phones from China and use them near the border where they can take advantage of Chinese mobile networks that work there.  The North Korean government has cracked down on illegal phones by deploying surveillance and jamming devices.

Many lines in the Rason Special Economic Zone can also be direct-dialled from outside the country, as many foreign companies (mostly Chinese and Russian) are active in the region.

Calls between North Korea and South Korea are barred, except to/from Kaesong Industrial Region.

References

External links
 North Korea at World Telephone Numbering Guide

Korea, North
Communications in North Korea
North Korea communications-related lists